The Major Indoor Soccer League (MISL), known in its final two seasons as the Major Soccer League, was an indoor soccer league in the United States that played matches from fall 1978 to spring 1992.

History
The MISL was founded by businessmen Ed Tepper and Earl Foreman in October 1977.

The league fielded six teams for its inaugural 1978–79 season.  Before folding after 14 seasons of competition, at the conclusion of the 1991–92 season, a total of 24 franchises – under 31 team names (seven teams changed city/name) – had played in the MISL.

Over its life, MISL teams were based in 27 different cities – with two different teams, at different times, playing in Cleveland, East Rutherford, New Jersey, St. Louis and Uniondale, New York.

The Houston Summit (1978–80)/Baltimore Blast (1980–92) franchise was the only one to compete for the entire 14 seasons of the MISL's existence. The next longest-lived franchise, and the longest in a single city, was the Wichita Wings team, which played for 13 seasons and missed only the inaugural 1978–79 season. The third longest-lived franchise was the Detroit Lightning (1979–80)/San Francisco Fog (1980–81)/Kansas City Comets (1981–91) franchise, which played for 12 seasons, missing only the first and last seasons.

The San Diego Sockers was the most successful franchise, winning eight of the MISL's 14 overall championships during the team's nine seasons in the league. The New York Arrows won the MISL's first four championships, then folded after the league's sixth season.

The most successful player in the MISL is arguably Steve Zungul, a Yugoslav American striker who was MISL Most Valuable Player six times, was the Scoring Champion six times, the Pass Master (most assists) four times, played on eight championship-winning teams (and one runner-up), and won Championship Series Most Valuable Player four times.  Zungul is the MISL's all-time leader in goals (652, nearly 200 ahead of the second highest scorer), assists (471, nearly 100 ahead of second) and points (1,123, nearly 300 ahead of second).

Despite ongoing financial hardships, the MISL had some success.  The league averaged a respectable 7,644 fans per game over its 14 regular seasons, and averaged 9,049 fans per game over its 14 playoff runs.

The league changed its name to the Major Soccer League (MSL) in 1990, and then folded in 1992. Four of the league's seven franchises continued to operate: Cleveland Crunch and Wichita Wings joined the National Professional Soccer League; Dallas Sidekicks and San Diego Sockers helped found the Continental Indoor Soccer League.

MISL inspires Arena Football
The concept was initially so popular that in 1981, it helped pave the way for the creation of another indoor sports league, the Arena Football League, and subsequently the entire sport of indoor "gridiron" football.  During the MISL All-Star Game at Madison Square Garden, National Football League promotions director Jim Foster sketched a design of what a football field would look like on the back of a 9x12 manila envelope.  That inspiration gave birth to the concept now known as arena football (also indoor football) and the AFL was born six years later.  Foster credits the MISL for the inspiration.

MISL teams

*Three North American Soccer League (NASL) teams temporarily joined the MISL for the 1982–83 season, as the NASL did not play indoors for that season. As the NASL was folding in 1985, four of its former teams (Chicago, Minnesota, New York and San Diego) joined the MISL in late 1984.

The "Denver Avalanche" had declared bankruptcy and ceased operations after the 1981–82 season, but the franchise still existed and was purchased out of bankruptcy and moved to Tacoma after a dormant season.  The MISL, however, considered the Stars a new franchise and, thus, team records did not transfer to Tacoma.

In June 1987, the MISL granted a conditional franchise to NBA Denver Nuggets owner Sidney Shlenker, to commence play in the 1988–89 season.  When the tentative "Denver Desperados" attracted deposits on 400 season tickets, rather than the required 5,000 within four months, the franchise was revoked in November 1987.

Attendance

MISL/MSL Championship Series

By year

*Single-game championship, game score rather than series results.

By club

Commissioners
 Earl Foreman (1978–1985)
 Francis Dale (1985–1986)
 Bill Kentling (1986–1989)
 Earl Foreman (1989–1992)

All-time statistics leaders

Points
 1,123 –   Steve Zungul (New York Arrows, Golden Bay Earthquakes, San Diego Sockers, Tacoma Stars)
 841 –   Branko Šegota (New York Arrows, San Diego Sockers, St.Louis Storm)
 690 –  Tatu (Dallas Sidekicks)
 686 –  Dale Mitchell (Tacoma Stars, Kansas City Comets, Baltimore Blast)
 683 –  Kai Haaskivi (Houston Summit, Cleveland Force, Baltimore Blast, Cleveland Crunch)
 682 –  Jan Goossens (Golden Bay Earthquakes, Minnesota Strikers, Kansas City Comets, Dallas Sidekicks)
 664 –   Preki (Tacoma Stars, St. Louis Storm)
 612 –  Chico Borja (Las Vegas Americans, Wichita Wings, Los Angeles Lazers)
 544 –   Fred Grgurev (Philadelphia Fever, New York Arrows, New Jersey Rockets, Memphis/Las Vegas Americans, Pittsburgh Spirit, New York Express)
 542 –   Stan Stamenkovic (Memphis Americans, Baltimore Blast)

Goals
 652 –  Steve Zungul (New York Arrows, Golden Bay Earthquakes, San Diego Sockers, Tacoma Stars)
 463 –  Branko Šegota (New York Arrows, San Diego Sockers, St. Louis Storm)
 406 –  Tatu (Dallas Sidekicks)
 406 –  Dale Mitchell (Tacoma Stars, Kansas City Comets, Baltimore Blast)
 344 –  Jan Goossens (Golden Bay Earthquakes, Minnesota Strikers, Kansas City Comets, Dallas Sidekicks)
 332 –  Preki (Tacoma Stars, St. Louis Storm)
 331 –  Fred Grgurev (Philadelphia Fever, New York Arrows, New Jersey Rockets, Memphis/Las Vegas Americans, Pittsburgh Spirit, New York Express)
 307 –  Andy Chapman (Wichita Wings, Cleveland Force, Baltimore Blast)
 297 –  Craig Allen (New Jersey Rockets, Cleveland Force)
 297 –  Kai Haaskivi (Houston Summit, Cleveland Force, Baltimore Blast, Cleveland Crunch)

Assists
 471 –  Steve Zungul (New York Arrows, Golden Bay Earthquakes, San Diego Sockers, Tacoma Stars)
 386 –  Kai Haaskivi (Houston Summit, Cleveland Force, Baltimore Blast, Cleveland Crunch)
 378 –  Branko Šegota (New York Arrows, San Diego Sockers, St. Louis Storm)
 338 –  Chico Borja (New York Cosmos, Las Vegas Americans, Wichita Wings, Los Angeles Lazers)
 338 –  Jan Goossens (Golden Bay Earthquakes, Minnesota Strikers, Kansas City Comets, Dallas Sidekicks)
 332 –  Preki (Tacoma Stars, St. Louis Storm)
 311 –  Stan Stamenkovic (Memphis Americans, Baltimore Blast)
 284 –  Tatu (Dallas Sidekicks)
 280 –  Dale Mitchell (Tacoma Stars, Kansas City Comets, Baltimore Blast)
 271 –  Jorgen Kristensen (Wichita Wings, Kansas City Comets)

Goals against average
(9,500 minutes minimum)
 4.03 –  Zoltán Tóth (New York Arrows, San Diego Sockers, St. Louis Storm)
 4.09 –  Tino Lettieri (Minnesota Strikers)
 4.14 –  Krzysztof Sobieski (Pittsburgh Spirit, Cleveland Force, Dallas Sidekicks)
 4.18 –  Victor Nogueira (Chicago Sting, Cleveland Force, San Diego Sockers)
 4.21 –  David Brcic (New York Cosmos, Wichita Wings, Pittsburgh Spirit, Los Angeles Lazers, Kansas City Comets, St. Louis Storm)
 4.26 –  Slobo Ilijevski (St. Louis Steamers, Baltimore Blast, St. Louis Storm)
 4.32 –  P.J. Johns (Cleveland Force, Tacoma Stars, Cleveland Crunch)
 4.35 –  Jim Gorsek (San Diego Sockers, Los Angeles Lazers, Kansas City Comets, St. Louis Storm)
 4.3972 –  Joe Papaleo (Pittsburgh Spirit, Tacoma Stars, Dallas Sidekicks)
 4.3979 –  Keith Van Eron (Cincinnati Kids, Wichita Wings, Philadelphia Fever, Baltimore Blast, Las Vegas Americans)

Awards

Most Valuable Player

Scoring Champion

MISL Pass Master
The Pass Master award was given out to the player with the most assists during the regular season.

Defender of the Year

Goalkeeper of the Year

Rookie of the Year

Newcomer of the Year
This award was given to 'the most outstanding player in his first year of competition in the Major Indoor Soccer League' in order to differentiate it from the Rookie of the Year award.

Coach of the Year

Championship Series Most Valuable Player

Championship Series Unsung Hero
This award was given to the player 'in the Championship Series whose impact to his team's success was measured by hustle, determination and leadership.'

Prominent players

 Ralph Black
  Chico Borja
 Andy Chapman
  Paul Child
  Fernando Clavijo
 Dan Counce
 Kevin Crow
 Steve David
 Rick Davis
 Enzo Di Pede
 Daryl Doran
 Don Ebert
 Pat Ercoli
 Andranik Eskandarian
 Joey Fink
 Jan Goossens
 Karl-Heinz Granitza
  Gerry Gray
  Fred Grgurev
 Kai Haaskivi
  Slobo Ilijevski
 Tommy Jenkins
  Erhardt Kapp
 Zoran Karić
 Michael King
 Jorgen Kristensen
 Erik Rasmussen
 Mickey Kydes
  Doc Lawson
  Tino Lettieri
  Mark Liveric
 Dave MacWilliams
 Scott Manning
 Pato Margetic
 Hector Marinaro
 Alan Mayer
 Wes McLeod
 Dale Mitchell
  George Nanchoff
 Victor Nogueira
 Steve Pecher
  Hugo Perez
 Ljupko Petrović
  Preki
 Kim Roentved
 Carl Rose
 Bruce Savage
  Branko Šegota
  Stan Stamenkovic
 John Stremlau
 Mike Sweeney
 Zoltán Tóth
 Thompson Usiyan
  Carl Valentine
  Juli Veee
 Tatu
 Peter Ward
 Jean Willrich
  Steve Zungul

Television and radio coverage

The MISL made inroads on national television in 1982–83. While the spring would see the end of the league's two-year deal with the USA Network, CBS would broadcast a playoff game live from Cleveland on May 7 that drew an estimated four million viewers. One game during the 1983–84 season was televised on CBS (Game 3 of the championship series on June 2) as well.

1984–85 would be the final year the MISL would have games aired on network television, CBS broadcast Game 4 of the championship series live on May 25.

References

External links
The MISL: A Look Back
All-Time MISL Standings
All-Time MISL Attendance
MISL Yearly Awards
Major Indoor Soccer League history – American Soccer History Archives

 
1986 labor disputes and strikes
Defunct indoor soccer leagues in the United States
Sports leagues established in 1978
Defunct professional sports leagues in the United States
1978 establishments in the United States
1992 disestablishments in the United States